Salisbury railway station is located on the Beenleigh Line in Queensland, Australia. It serves the Brisbane suburb of Salisbury. The station opened in 1885 at the same time as the line.

In September 1930, Salisbury became a junction with the opening of the standard gauge NSW North Coast line.

In 1996, as part of the construction of the Gold Coast line, the standard gauge line was converted to dual gauge.

Services
Salisbury station is served by all stops Beenleigh line services from Beenleigh, Kuraby and Coopers Plains to Bowen Hills and Ferny Grove.

Services by platform

References

External links

Salisbury station Queensland's Railways on the Internet
[ Salisbury station] TransLink travel information

Railway stations in Brisbane
Railway stations in Australia opened in 1885